Leonardo Luppino (born September 18, 1975 in Buenos Aires, Argentina) is a retired Argentine association football midfielder.

Teams
  Boca Juniors 1996
  Almagro 1996-1997
  Douglas Haig 1997
  Huachipato 1998
  Deportivo Quito 1998
  Audaz Octubrino 1999
  Tigre 1999-2000
  Villa Mitre 2000-2001
  Jorge Wilstermann 2001-2002
  Aurora 2003
  Estudiantes de La Plata 2003-2004
  Blooming 2004
  Emelec 2005
  Huracán de Tres Arroyos 2005-2006
  Sarmiento de Junín 2006-2007
  Los Andes 2007-2008
  Nueva Chicago 2008-2009
  Defensores de Belgrano 2009-2010
  Villa Mitre 2010
  Ferrocarril Midland 2011-XXXX

References
 Profile at BDFA 
 

1975 births
Living people
Argentine footballers
Argentine expatriate footballers
Estudiantes de La Plata footballers
Club Atlético Los Andes footballers
Huracán de Tres Arroyos footballers
Club Atlético Sarmiento footballers
Defensores de Belgrano footballers
Nueva Chicago footballers
Boca Juniors footballers
Club Atlético Douglas Haig players
Villa Mitre footballers
Club Atlético Tigre footballers
Club Almagro players
Club Aurora players
Club Blooming players
C.D. Jorge Wilstermann players
S.D. Quito footballers
C.S. Emelec footballers
C.D. Huachipato footballers
Expatriate footballers in Chile
Expatriate footballers in Bolivia
Expatriate footballers in Ecuador
Association football midfielders
Footballers from Buenos Aires